Steyr (Central Bavarian: Steia) is a statutory city, located in the Austrian federal state of Upper Austria. It is the administrative capital, though not part of Steyr-Land District. Steyr is Austria's 12th most populated town and the 3rd largest city in Upper Austria.

The city has a long history as a manufacturing center and has given its name to several manufacturers headquartered there, such as the former Steyr-Daimler-Puch conglomerate and its successor Steyr Motors.

Geography

The city is situated in the Traunviertel region, with the two rivers Steyr and Enns flowing through it and meeting near the town centre beneath Lamberg Castle and St Michael's Church. This prominent location has made it prone to severe flooding through the centuries until the present, one of the worst cases being recently in August 2002. To the south of the town rises a series of hills that climb in altitude and stretch out to the Upper Austrian Prealps. To the north, the hills roll downward towards the confluence of the Enns with the Danube River, where the town of Enns is situated. In the east, the municipal area borders with Lower Austria.

Steyr is an ancient town with modern amenities, marketing its rich cultural and architectural heritage in tourism like Vienna and many other well preserved Austrian historic towns. It marked its 1,000th anniversary in 1980, after undergoing extensive restoration of its historic architecture which has made it one of the best preserved old towns in the country. The famous historic town centre built around the Stadtplatz (town square) was largely restored following World War II. Its best-known piece of architecture is called the Bummerlhaus which is considered one of the finest examples of Gothic architecture for its size in Central Europe.

The city comprises the cadastral communities of Christkindl, Föhrenschacherl, Gleink, Hinterberg, Jägerberg, Sarning, Stein, and Steyr.

History

Celts settled the area from about 600 BC, the name of the Stiria River is of Celtic origin. Their kingdom of Noricum became part of the Roman Empire in 15 BC. A settlement named Gesodunum noted by the ancient geographer Claudius Ptolemy (c. 90 – c. 168) was possibly located in the Steyr region. Here the Roman "Iron Road" led from the Erzberg mine along the Enns River to the castra of Lauriacum (at present-day Enns) on the Danube.

In the 6th century, Slavic settlers moved into the area, but when they were defeated by Duke Tassilo III of Bavaria, who granted the land to nearby Kremsmünster Abbey in 777, the area was resettled with Bavarians. During the Hungarian invasions of Europe, a fortress was erected above the Steyr River by the local Traungau counts, first mentioned as Styraburg in a 980 deed. From 1055 Steyr Castle in the Bavarian Traungau as well as the adjacent "March of Styria" were ruled by the mighty Otakar dynasty. The Otokars controlled the iron mining at Erzberg and made their residence at Steyr a centre of medieval courtly culture and Middle High German poetry. 

In 1180, Emperor Frederick Barbarossa elevated Margrave Ottokar IV to a Duke of Styria; however, the line became extinct upon his death in 1192 and, according to the 1186 Georgenberg Pact, his Styrian lands fell to the Babenberg dukes of Austria.

Steyr, already named a town (urbs) by then, lost its importance as a ducal residence but retained its status as a centre of ironworking. The Babenberg rulers promoted its economic development as a site of blacksmithing, mainly knife making and armament industry. After the extinction of the Babenbergs in 1246, Steyr together with the Duchy of Austria was occupied by the Přemyslid king Ottokar II of Bohemia and finally taken over by the Habsburg king Rudolf I of Germany upon his victory at the 1278 Battle on the Marchfeld. The town privileges and market rights were confirmed by Rudolf's son King Albert I in 1287 and the citizens further on benefitted of Steyr's preferred position within the iron trade all over the Holy Roman Empire and  especially with the Republic of Venice.

In the 13th and 14th century, Steyr was a centre of the Christian Waldensian movement and a location of the inquisitorial persecutions led by the Catholic cleric Petrus Zwicker (d. 1403). Likewise, the Protestant Reformation quickly spread among the citizens about 1525, fiercely opposed by the Habsburg rulers in the course of the Counter-Reformation. 

The economic situation changed for the worse, as the iron trade decayed during the Thirty Years' War, when Upper Austria was pawned to Duke Maximilian I of Bavaria, and the Peasants' War in Upper Austria of 1626. In 1727 the medieval Styraburg was devastated by a blaze and replaced by the Baroque Lamberg Castle. The resurgence of Steyr began under the conditions of late 18th century Josephinism and continued in the course of the succeeding industrialisation. During the Napoleonic Wars Steyr was occupied by French troops several times. On 25 December 1800, the Armistice of Steyr was signed there.

In 1830 the blacksmith Leopold Werndl founded an armory at Steyr, which his sons Josef and Franz Werndl re-established as a stock company in 1864, named the Österreichische Waffenfabriksgesellschaft (ÖWG) from 1869. Including the Steyr automobile branch from 1915 it was renamed Steyr-Werke AG in 1926 and formed a large industrial conglomerate by the merger with Austro-Daimler and Puch in 1934. However, the Steyr industry was hit hard by the 1929 Great Depression. 

In 1934, the town became one of several battlegrounds between Social Democratic Schutzbund paramilitary forces and Christian Social Heimwehr militias in the Austrian Civil War, which brought about the fascist corporate Federal State of Austria that ruled the country until the 1938 Anschluss to Nazi Germany.

The Nazi authorities incorporated the armament industry into the vast Reichswerke Hermann Göring conglomerate, including the construction of the Steyr-Münichholz subcamp of forced labourers, part of the Mauthausen network. A major producer of arms and military vehicles during World War II, Steyr became a target of Allied bombing raids to knock out its factories. In two major attacks by the US Fifteenth Air Force during the "Big Week" on 23 and 24 February 1944, much of the town was badly damaged, but the factories continued to function until near the end of the war. 

The city was a meeting point on 9 May 1945, when units of the 5th Guards Airborne of the Red Army and black troops of the US 761st Tank Battalion along with the 71st Infantry Division contacted each other on the bridge over the Enns River. Steyr was occupied by the U.S. Army—the Soviet Army moved east behind the demarcation line of the province of Lower Austria. The troops remained until 1955 when Austria officially declared neutrality by the Austrian State Treaty.

Population

Local council 
The local council (Gemeinderat) has 36 members. 
Elections in 2015 showed the following results:
 SPÖ 16 seats
 FPÖ 10 seats
 ÖVP 5 seats
 The Greens - The Green Alternative 4 seats
 NEOS 1 seat

Economy 
The most heavily represented sector is the manufacturing automotive parts. The most significant companies in Steyr are: 
 BMW Motors
 GFM Steyr GmbH
 MAN
 NKE AUSTRIA GmbH
 Profactor
 SKF
 Steyr Motors
 ZF Steyr

In other sectors are also important Austrian companies in Steyr:
 Eckelt Glass GmbH
 Hartlauer
 Steyr-Mannlicher

Infrastructure

Health systems
The Pyhrn-Eisenwurzen Klinikum Steyr is the general hospital of the city and the largest health care provider in the region with a capacity of 621 beds. It is also a teaching hospital affiliated with the medical universities of Vienna, Graz and Innsbruck. 

The Steyr School of General Health and Nursing offers a degree in nursing science and training to become a certified nurse. The oldest part is the 1916 castle-like old building. The hospital has been continually expanded since 1935.

Energy 

Steyr has a district heating system which supplies the bulk of the buildings and industry with renewable energy. The thermal energy comes from the Steyr biomass heating plant.

Sport
The local professional football team is SK Vorwärts Steyr who play at the Vorwärts Stadium.

People

Steyr has had a number of well-known residents or visitors, including Franz Schubert, who wrote his Trout Quintet there while on holiday, and composer Anton Bruckner, organist at the local parish church. Young Adolf Hitler spent a brief period there while he attended the Steyr secondary school in 1904, living in a room on Grünmarkt. The school is located in the same building as the famous Saint Michael's Church. Notable natives of Steyr are:
 Johannes Stabius (c. 1460–1522), cartographer
 Johann Michael Vogl (1768–1840), singer
 Johann Mayrhofer (1787–1836), poet
 Ferdinand Redtenbacher (1809–1863), engineer
 Josef Werndl (1831–1889), arms producer, engineer and inventor
 Ignaz Trollmann (1860-1919), general in the Austro-Hungarian Army
 Michael Blümelhuber (1865–1936), metalcutter
 August Eigruber (1907–1947), Nazi Gauleiter hanged for war crimes
 Franz Schausberger (b. 1950), politician and historian
 Erich Hackl (b. 1954), novelist
 Wilhelm Molterer (b. 1955), politician
 Ronald Brunmayr (b. 1975), football player
 Georg Harding (b. 1981), football player
 Emanuel Schreiner (b. 1989), football player
 Kevin Stöger (b. 1993), football player
 Franz Wickhoff (1853–1909) was an Austrian art historian and a member of the Vienna School of Art History

International relations

Steyr is twinned with:

 Bethlehem, Palestine
 Kettering, USA
 Plauen, Germany
 San Benedetto del Tronto, Italy

References

External links

 Official Homepage of the City of Steyr 
 Live webcam of main square
 http://www.e-steyr.com Communitysite for news, nightlife, society, sports and culture

 
Cities and towns in Upper Austria
March of Styria
Duchy of Styria